Houston Academy  is a non-profit independent college preparatory school in Dothan, Alabama. The school offers instruction to children from preschool through grade 12. The nineteen acre campus is located on the west side of Dothan in a middle class residential area.

History 
The school was founded in 1970 in response to integration of the public schools in Dothan, as a way to maintain segregated schooling under the guise of private education. This history received national attention in 2016, when Bill Clinton revealed in a campaign speech that his wife Hillary Clinton had made an undercover visit to the area investigating segregation academies in 1972. In 1970, the IRS allowed the school to retain its tax exempt status despite its policy of discriminating on racial grounds.

While the school no longer enforces a ban on non-white students, in 2015 only eight black students were enrolled and thirteen percent of the student population were minorities of any kind.

Mark Saliba, the current mayor of Dothan, was a chairman of the school's board from 2007 until 2014.

Campus 
The campus, which was renovated in 1995, has four buildings connected by covered walkways. Included in the facilities are forty-five classrooms, two daycare rooms, a library, a Lower School science laboratory, Upper School laboratories for chemistry, biology and physical science, a Middle School science laboratory, state of the art Lower and Upper School art rooms, two gymnasiums, a classroom for music and band, and a cafeteria. In 2002, the Dove Center was completed. It houses the Upper School English department, a computer classroom, an art room and the library. In 2014, the Student Activity Center, a comprehensive weightlifting, fitness and conditioning facility, was completed. The school also maintains two playgrounds, one renovated in 2005 with covered areas, the other renovated in 2015 to include an outdoor basketball court. In addition, the campus includes a practice football field and a practice baseball field. As of 2022, the campus is currently undergoing renovations and constructions of the building, with a new Fine Arts building opened to students in May of 2022.

References 

Buildings and structures in Dothan, Alabama
Educational institutions established in 1970
Private elementary schools in Alabama
Private high schools in Alabama
Private middle schools in Alabama
Schools in Houston County, Alabama
Preparatory schools in Alabama
Segregation academies in Alabama